Adolphe Pezzuli (4 July 1928 – 11 January 2013) was a French racing cyclist. He rode in the 1952 Tour de France.

References

1928 births
2013 deaths
French male cyclists
Place of birth missing